The Men's sabre event of the 2015 World Fencing Championships was held on 14 July 2015. The qualification was held on 13 July 2015.

Medalists

Draw

Finals

Top half

Section 1

Section 2

Bottom half

Section 3

Section 4

References

 Bracket

2015 World Fencing Championships